Wivi Lönn (20 May 1872 – 27 December 1966), born as Olivia Mathilda Lönn, was a Finnish architect. She was the first woman to be awarded the honorary title of "Professor" by the Finnish  Association of Architects.

Early life and education 
Olivia Mathilda Lönn was born in the village of Onkiniemi, near Tampere on 20 May 1872. Her father was Wilhelm Lönn, a local brewer, and her mother Mathilda Siren. After graduating from the Industrial School of Tampere she moved to Helsinki. From 1893 to 1896, she studied architecture at the Polytechnic University of Helsinki. During the same period, she won first prize in several architectural competitions. During her life, she developed a close friendship with Hanna Parviainen, with whom she collaborated many times.

Later career 
Her graduation from the university was followed by the establishment of her architectural office, making her the first independently practising female architect of Finland. In 1904, she won the first architectural prize in a contest of the mercantile school of Tampere. From 1909 to 1913, Wivi Lönn and Armas Lindgren designed and built the Estonia Theatre in the Art Nouveau style, and the Uusi Ylioppilastalo. In 1913, she moved to Jyväskylä, where she developed several architectural projects, among them a school, a factory, and several other buildings. In 1913, the Sodankylä Geophysical Observatory, designed by her, was also completed.

In the 1910s, she designed the home in Jyväskylä of the well-known architect Alvar Aalto. The project was finished in 1915. In the 1920s, she cooperated with Hanna Parviainen in many architectural projects in the area of Jyväskylä, such as nursery schools, healthcare stations, a church and a library. At the same time, she designed and built the headquarters of the Young Women's Christian Association (YWCA) in Helsinki. In 1945, the Sodankylä Geophysical Observatory, designed by her, was also completed. In 1956, she became the first woman to be awarded the honorary title of the "Professor" by SAFA, the Finnish Association of Architects.

Wivi Lönn died on 27 December 1966 in Helsinki.

In 2010, sculptor Sonja Vectomov unveiled a remarkable statue of Lönn at the center of a private park facing Lönn's own erstwhile mansion, the outline of which appears on its pedestal (an obscure reference to Lönn's use of the same outline on a doghouse she had designed).

The year 2022 marks 150 years since the birth of Wivi Lönn. To mark the occasion, the Museum of Finnish Architecture have arranged a major retrospective of her life and career, "LONG LIVE WIVI LÖNN!", on display at the museum during the dates 29.04.2022-08.01.2023. Architecta, the Finnish Association of Women Architects, was founded in 1942, around about the time of Wivi Lönn's 70th birthday on May 20th that year, a group of 46 Finnish women architects having gathered together at the Lallukka Artists’ Home in Helsinki on her birthday to celebrate the occasion. The museum exhibition also includes a section on the history and activities of Architecta.

Notable buildings

See also
 Women in architecture

References

External links 

1872 births
1966 deaths
20th-century Finnish architects
People from Tampere
People from Häme Province (Grand Duchy of Finland)
Finnish women architects
Art Nouveau architects